Olive is a free and open-source cross-platform video editing application for Linux, Windows and macOS. It is currently in alpha. 

It is released under GNU General Public License version 3. It is written in C++ and uses Qt for its graphical user interface, FFmpeg for its multimedia functions, OpenImageIO library, OpenColorIO for color management and CMake build system for configuring.

The plan of the development team is to combine complete color management, a fast and high-fidelity half-float/float-based render pipeline, node-based compositing and audio mixing, and a highly efficient automated disk cache all together in the one program. According to the development team, this batch of features is one "no other NLE - not even commercial - has tried to do".

Features

History 
Olive 0.1 was in development for a year before it was published. The original author said that the program itself was his first C++ and his first large-scale programming project. Due to being inexperienced the author says that a lot of programming and video handling mistakes were made. Since the code base of 0.1 wouldn't allow planned features and because the development team saw that the "codebase was full of problems that made it unsustainable", the program had to be rewritten from the ground up.

Version 0.2 (unofficial title The Rewrite) is planned to provide the solid base for the planned features. Even though 0.2 is not officially released yet, nightly builds can be downloaded and tested. It is also planned to add support for OpenTimelineIO.

The far future version 0.3 is planned to improve project management features allowing users to pre-cache only the parts of a video needed. It is also planned to improve the integration of multiple projects making collaborative work easier as well as improving the render pipeline for network rendering to allow multiple computers working together rendering the same project for preview caching and for export.

Release history

See also 

 Comparison of video editing software
 List of video editing software
 List of video editing free software
 Non-linear editing system

References

External links 

 

Video editing software
Free video software
Video editing software for Linux
Video editing software for Windows
MacOS multimedia software
Software that uses Qt